Tricholosporum cossonianum is a species of fungus in the family Tricholomataceae.

Taxonomy
The species was first described as Tricholoma cossonianum by René Maire. Robert Kühner and Henri Romagnesi transferred it to Lyophyllum in 1953, and it was again transferred into Tricholosporum in 2007.

References

External links

Fungi of Europe
cossonianum
Fungi described in 1926